Rebeccamycin (NSC 655649) is a weak topoisomerase I inhibitor isolated from Nocardia sp.  It is structurally similar to staurosporine, but does not show any inhibitory activity against protein kinases. It shows significant antitumor properties in vitro (IC50=480nM against mouse B16 melanoma cells and IC50=500nM against P388 leukemia cells). It is an antineoplastic antibiotic and an intercalating agent.

Becatecarin (BMS-181176) is a synthetic analog of rebeccamycin.

Rebeccamycin and becatecarin have been tested in phase II clinical trials for the treatment of lung cancer, liver cancer, breast cancer, lymphoma, retinoblastoma, kidney cancer, and ovarian cancer.

References

Further reading 

 
 
 
 
 

Experimental cancer drugs
Topoisomerase inhibitors
Halogen-containing alkaloids